Sadettin Pasha (1851–1908) was an Ottoman pasha and Defterdarlı Sukru Mehmet Efendi's son. He was assigned to suppress the Herzegovina rebellion in 1875. Sadettin Pasha was in charge of the Ottoman troops during the Van Revolt of 1896.

References

1851 births
1908 deaths
Pashas